Nasser Al-Saiari (born August 1, 1988), is a Saudi Arabian professional footballer who plays as a goalkeeper for Al-Ain.

References

External links 
 

Living people
1988 births
Saudi Arabian footballers
Al-Okhdood Club players
Al-Hamadah Club players
Najran SC players
Al-Nahda Club (Saudi Arabia) players
Al-Jabalain FC players
Al-Ain FC (Saudi Arabia) players
Saudi First Division League players
Saudi Professional League players
Saudi Second Division players
Association football goalkeepers